CCCP Fedeli alla Linea, officially written CCCP - Fedeli alla Linea, were an Italian band formed in 1982 in Berlin by vocalist Giovanni Lindo Ferretti and guitarist Massimo Zamboni. The band's style was self-defined by the members themselves as "Musica Melodica Emiliana—Punk Filosovietico" ("Emilian Melodic Music—pro-Soviet punk")

Their name, CCCP, stems from the cyrillic script for SSSR, Russian acronym for the Union of Soviet Socialist Republics, although pronounced following the Italian phonetics.

CCCP left behind the stereotypes of punk rock, and reached for a genre-defying convergence of militant rock, industrial music, folk, electropop, Middle Eastern music, and even chamber music while delivering through their lyrics a bleak vision of humankind, also introducing elements of expressionist theatre and existentialist philosophy in their live shows.

CCCP's works influenced dozen of artists such as Marlene Kuntz, Massimo Volume, and Offlaga Disco Pax.

History

1981–1983: Formation

CCCP was formed in 1981 when Ferretti met Zamboni (both were from Reggio Emilia) in a discothèque in Kreuzberg (Berlin). Once they returned home they founded a new band called MitropaNK. During the following summer Ferretti, Zamboni and bassist Umberto Negri returned to Berlin: it was during that trip that CCCP Fedeli alla Linea were born. The band members decided to use a drum machine instead of an actual drummer.

The name of the band celebrates the popular sub-culture of Emilia while also praising the Soviet Union, creating a link between Russia and the typical province of Emilia-Romagna.

During this period the band performed several times in Germany, playing some underground clubs in Berlin such as the Kob or the Spectrumin. Their permanence in Berlin influenced the sound of the band through the local industrial scene. East Berlin's culture and the Islamic community of the West side of the town also influenced Ferretti's lyrics.

The band's first concerts in Italy were met with a negative response from the crowd, leading the band to add two new members to the line-up: Annarella Giudici "Benemerita soubrette" (well-deserved soubrette), and a performer named Danilo Fatur. Annarella, Fatur, and for a little time Silvia Bonvicini (a second "Benemerita soubrette") contributed to characterize their concerts by playing comic-demential sketches during their gigs.

1984–1985: First EPs
In 1984 the band released Ortodossia, their first EP on the independent label Attack Punk Records. In the same year theOrtodossia II EP was released, which included the same three songs already included in their first EP ("Live in Pankow", "Spara Jurij", and "Punk Islam") plus an additional fourth track ("Mi ami?"). 1985 saw the release of their third EP, Compagni, Cittadini, Fratelli, Partigiani.

The three EPs were produced and recorded by the band with very little money and few musical instruments in a single room set as a recording studio, near to a city tram line constantly disturbing the recording.

1986: Debut album
Their first studio album, 1964/1985 Affinità-Divergenze fra il Compagno Togliatti e Noi - Del Conseguimento della Maggiore Età, was recorded during 1985 and published by Attack Punk Records in 1986. It reduced the visceral impact of hardcore while focusing on the eerie contrast between a harsh but spare instrumental background and Ferretti's delirious cut-up lyrics and Brecht-ian delivery. An eclectic stylistic range (from existential psychodrama to dance groove, from erotic cabaret to folk ballad) helped craft an oppressive atmosphere of angst and boredom, particularly in the centerpiece, "Emilia Paranoica".

This album is considered by many music critics one of the masterpieces of contemporary Italian music, and a milestone for the whole European punk movement. The album's sales induced Virgin Dischi, the Italian branch of Virgin to sign the band. Some of the band's fans saw this move as betrayal and nicknamed the band "CCCP fedeli alla lira" with lira (the old Italian currency before the introduction of Euro) instead of linea ('line' in the sense of 'party line', in line with the soviet theme).

1987–1988: Signed for Virgin
In 1987 the band recorded and released their first single Oh! Battagliero and their second album, Socialismo e Barbarie, which was made with a relatively big budget if compared with the first one. It is a less cohesive work, that ran the gamut from Middle Eastern music to a rock version of the Soviet anthem, from Catholic hymns to feedback workouts.

In 1988 Virgin re-released Socialismo e Barbarie on CD, and their first EPs on the compilation Compagni, cittadini, fratelli, partigiani / Ortodossia II.

In the same year, CCCP released the single Tomorrow (Voulez vous un rendez vous), a cover version of a song by the singer and painter Amanda Lear; Amanda Lear sang on both the two tracks of the single.

1989: Third album
The third album, Canzoni, Preghiere, Danze del II Millennio - Sezione Europa (1989), signs their musical change to electropop. Keyboard, instead of guitar, became the most important instrument. Their sound is now influenced by Middle Eastern music and is softer than in the previous records. It replaces the original sociopolitical emphasis with mystical overtones, and their industrial hardcore with a far less revolutionary synthpop.

1989–1990: Litfiba and demise
In 1989 CCCP, Litfiba, and Rats went on tour in the Soviet Union (Moscow and Leningrad). In Moscow they played in a palace full of soldiers in uniform. The soldiers stood up when the band played at the end of the concert the Soviet hymn "A Ja Ljublju SSSR". 

During this year guitarist Giorgio Canali, bassist Gianni Maroccolo, keyboardist Francesco Magnelli, and drummer Ringo De Palma (the last three left the Litfiba because of some artistical difference of opinion with band's manager Alberto Pirelli) joined and transformed the group.

The group, now composed by eight members, recorded their fourth album Epica Etica Etnica Pathos in an abandoned 700' villa. This album signes another musical evolution for the band. CCCP reached their zenith with this album, a Frank Zappa-esque stylistic puzzle which also stands as a personal musical encyclopedia, with complex suites such as "MACISTE contro TUTTI", their "swan song", and a transition to the new sonorities of the Consorzio Suonatori Indipendenti (C.S.I.), the new band born from the ashes of CCCP.

The acronym used for the new band name, C.S.I., reminds to the new situation in the Soviet Union, with the Commonwealth of Independent States (CIS) ( (CSI)). With the creation of the CIS, the Soviet Union and at the same time the band ceased to exist.

CCCP effectively disbanded the 3 October 1990, in the same date of the German reunification, and the members went on to other projects.

Post-CCCP 
When the Soviet Union collapsed, Ferretti and Zamboni decided to shuffle the line-up and adopt a less political stance. The renamed Consorzio Suonatori Indipendenti (C.S.I.) debuted with a set of songs from Ko del Mondo (Polygram, 1993). They rapidly evolved towards a form of chamber rock music (mostly drum-less) with Linea Gotica (Polygram, 1996).

When C.S.I. disbanded in 1999, Ferretti debuted solo with Co-dex (2000), then formed Per Grazia Ricevuta (PGR) and released PGR (2002) that steered towards world-music.
== Members ==
 Giovanni Lindo Ferretti (Cerreto Alpi, 9 September 1953): songwriter, vocals (1982–1990)
 Massimo Zamboni (Reggio Emilia, 1957): guitar, songwriter (1982–1990)
 Umberto Negri: bass, songwriter (1982–1985)
 Zeo Giudici: drums (1982–1983)
 Mirka Morselli - drums (1983)
 Annarella Giudici (born Antonella Giudici): "Benemerita soubrette" vocals (1984–1990)
 Danilo Fatur: "Artista del popolo" (people's artist) vocals (1984–1990)
 Silvia Bonvicini: vocals (1984–1985)
 Carlo Chiapparini: guitar (1986–1989)
 Ignazio Orlando: bass, keyboards, drums (1986–1989)
 Gianni Maroccolo (Manciano, 9 May 1960): bass (1989–1990)
 Francesco Magnelli: keyboards (1989–1990) 
 Ringo De Palma (born Luca De Benedictis, Turin, 28 December 1963 – Florence, 1 June 1990): drums (1989–1990)
 Giorgio Canali (1958): guitar, programming (1989–1990)

Members timeline

Discography

Studio albums
 1964/1985 Affinità-Divergenze fra il Compagno Togliatti e Noi - Del Conseguimento della Maggiore Età, Attack Punk Records, red vinyl 1986, re-released in 1988 by Virgin
 Socialismo e Barbarie, Virgin Records 1987, re-released in 1988 on CD with two extra tracks.
 Canzoni, Preghiere, Danze del II Millennio - Sezione Europa, Virgin, 1989
 Epica Etica Etnica Pathos, Virgin, 1990

Live albums
 Live in Punkow, Virgin, 1996

Compilation albums
 Compagni, cittadini, fratelli, partigiani / Ortodossia II, Virgin, 1988
 Ecco i miei gioielli, Virgin, 1992
 Enjoy CCCP, Virgin, 1994
 Essential (CCCP), EMI, 2012

Singles
 Oh! Battagliero, Virgin, 1987
 Tomorrow (Voulez vous un rendez vous) (feat. Amanda Lear), Virgin, 7" and 12" vinyl, 1988

EPs
 Ortodossia, Attack Punk Records, red vinyl, 1984
 Ortodossia II, Attack Punk Records, red vinyl, re-released in 1985 by Virgin in black vinyl
 Compagni, Cittadini, Fratelli, Partigiani, Attack Punk Records, picture disc, re-released in 1985 by Virgin in black vinyl
 Ragazza Emancipata, Stampa Alternativa, 1990

VHS
 Tempi moderni, 1989

Theatre
 Allerghia, 1987–1988

See also
 Consorzio Suonatori Indipendenti (C.S.I.)
 Per Grazia Ricevuta (PGR)

References

External links
 Annarella Benemerita Soubrette - CCCP - fedeli alla linea
 RudePravda - Fedeli alla Linea
 Interview with Umberto Negri on gomma.tv (in Italian)

 
Musical groups established in 1982
Italian new wave musical groups
Italian punk rock groups
Post-punk music groups
1982 establishments in Germany
Political music groups
Musical groups disestablished in 1990
Musical groups from Emilia-Romagna